Shantytown Kid is the debut novel of Azouz Begag, first published in French in 1986, then in English in 2007. Shantytown Kid is a bildungsroman, chronicling Begag's childhood growing up in the titular shantytown situated on the outskirts of Lyon, his experience in the French education system, and his identity as Muslim and a second-generation Algerian immigrant (known in French as a beur.) The novel won the Prix Sorcières in 1987.

Context of the Novel
Shantytown Kid is set during the 1960s, a period that directly follows the upheaval of the Algerian struggle for independence. At this time, there was an influx of Algerian immigration to France in large part due to wide-scale unemployment catalyzed by the failure of Algeria's economic infrastructure following the Algerian War.

The Évian Accords
In 1962, the French and Algerian governments signed the Évian Accords, the treaty that marked the official end of the Algerian War and of French Algeria. In this, both governments reached an agreement under which Algerian migrants would be legally authorized to work in France. This clause also provided the means by which France could exploit foreign labor by underpaying the Algerian workers who would provide the manpower to drive France's post-war revitalization. An overwhelming majority of male Algerian immigrants were employed as construction workers, such as Azouz Begag's father, Bouzid Begag. Azouz notes the long hours and arduous work that his father endures to provide for his family, observing him leaving to go to the building site at 5 o'clock in the morning early on the novel. Bouzid's insufficient salary becomes evident in an exchange between a prior resident of the chaâba, asking Bouzid where he will find the money to move into a new apartment located in the banlieues of Lyon.

Quotas and Family "Re-grouping"
In 1964, the French government enacted a strict quota that permitted only 12,000 Algerians to immigrate to France per year. This quota was a manifestation of the paranoia and hostility directed toward les algeriens that was legitimized in the French consciousness during the Algerian War. At the same time, a corollary to this policy allowed for male Algerian workers to be joined by their families—a process known as regroupement. By 1965, half a million Algerians resided in France, including Begag's family, who had come to France "fleeing the poverty of El-Ouricia [in Algeria]."

Social Conditions
In the 1960s, a large number of Algerian workers lived in poverty-stricken settlements known as bidonvilles. These slums were often overcrowded, structurally unsound, and lacking in basic plumbing and sanitation. Begag's description of the shantytown (le chaâba) echoes the reality of the bidonvilles: “Wooden shacks had sprouted up in the garden bordering the original concrete house [...] The shacks stood together, clinging to each other all around the house. A fierce gust of wind could bring them down in a single blow." The French government eventually destroyed many of the bidonvilles en masse in 1968 as they were considered public health hazards.

May 1968 
The social and economic conditions of many Algerian families had vastly deteriorated from an already poor quality of life in bidonvilles to squalor that many Algerians were no longer willing to tolerate. During the events of May 1968, Algerian immigrants protested alongside many other members of the French working class about the deplorable working conditions and poor pay they received as construction workers; hundreds of workers were later deported because of their participation in the protests. The sentiments of the workers who searched for more opportunity and, with that, a better life are evident in Bouzid's desire for Azouz to continue with his education and thus avoid his own fate: “I don’t want you to become what I am, a poor laborer” and his joy at his son's successes in school.

Bidonville to Banlieue
The large-scale destruction of bidonvilles in the late 1960s brought about the existence of banlieues: low-income, high-density housing projects in the suburbs of French cities. The relocation of Azouz's family near the end of the novel to an apartment located on the Avenue Monin in Lyon is indicative of the same transition many Algerian families underwent in the 1970s.

Author's Context

The Beur Generation
The word beur entered the French lexicon in the 1980s after the media dubbed the Marche pour l'égalité et contre le racism the Marche des beurs; a radio station known as Radio Beur also came into existence around this time. The word provided a distinction from the second-generation beurs and their parents, the Maghrebis who immigrated during the 1960s. Azouz himself notes how proud his parents feel in conveying the fact that Azouz was born in Lyon and not Algeria.

Beur was quickly reclaimed by the youth of the Algerian community to indicate a sense of pride and identity.

A Beur Renaissance?
The late 1980s saw an explosion of creative works centering on the beur experience that sought to “affirm [the Beur] self and identity” and establish a sense of permanency in their place in French society, a movement that also coincided with the emergence of the so-called “beurgoisie." Films like Abdelkrim Bahloul's Thé à la menthe (1984) and Mehdi Charef's Le thé au harem d'Archimède (1985) that focused on the beur “underclass” by depicting “young, streetwise, immigrant heroes” garnered much success. Characters such as Moussaoui as written in Shantytown Kid highlight many of the themes invoked in contemporary beur films of the 1980s: independence and rejection of French authority, typified in the scene in which Moussaoui refuses to submit to the public embarrassment Monsieur Grand wishes to provoke by having his students place their socks on their desks.

Beur Literature
Much of the literature written by beur authors in the 1980s were autobiographies as is Shantytown Kid. These works of literature differentiated the cultural experiences of the beurs and their parents, the Maghreb generation.

Humor is also characteristic of many beur works of literature. Examples of this light-hearted tone are woven throughout Shantytown Kid: in writing of his circumcision, Azouz muses, "in becoming Muslim, I lost a bit of myself, but I gained a red bike." The use of humor starkly contrasts to much of the racist vitriol originating from French citizens that has been and continues to be directed toward Algerian immigrants and their descendants.

Beur literature also provides a voice for the children of first-generation immigrants who have roots both in France and Algeria, sometimes privileging the former as does Azouz; in explaining the origin of his Algerian name: "It's because my parents were born in Algeria, that's all. So my name comes from over there. But I was born in Lyon, so I am French."

Critical reception
Shortly after the publication of Shantytown Kid, it was awarded the prestigious Prix Sorcières, an annual prize that rewards accomplishment in youth literature. The novel was immediately lauded as an immense success, particularly for its discourse on racism and for directing public attention toward the social and economic problems that continued to face the Algerian community.

Controversy
In 1987, two instructors in a French école wished to incorporate Begag's novel into their lesson plans. Controversy erupted in which parents of students censured the book as “pornography,” aided in their crusade by several right-wing French politicians such as Jean-Marie Le Pen. The incident culminated in the firing of one instructor. Shantytown Kid was also directly attacked by Le Pen, founder and leader of the conservative French political party Le Front national, during his political campaign in Lyon, Begag's hometown.

Begag also received similar backlash from the parents of the beur generation, the Maghrebis, who thought the novel was a “bad example” for their children, although Begag received an overwhelmingly positive response from many students of immigrant families who read the book, citing its realism and closeness to their own experiences.

Political Climate
The response of the French right-wing and Jean-Marie Le Pen in particular is indicative of a greater trend of anti-immigration rhetoric in French politics in the 1980s that criminalized the young Algerian male. Begag hints at this conception of the male Algerian youth as a stereotyped ne'er-do-well through the reaction of Monsieur Grand after he is challenged by Moussaoui; Grand exclaims, "The truth is you're a good-for-nothing and good-for-nothings like you never get anywhere in life," Grand later justifies his outburst by using Azouz as his model Algerian student, which Azouz resents.

These stereotypes were inflamed by paranoia that the beur youth was vulnerable to recruitment by Islamic terrorist organizations, such as the GIA and FIS, a perspective that was inflamed by the French media. The insubordination of Moussaoui and a few of his other classmates is Begag's creation of a microcosm set twenty years earlier to illuminate and criticize this notion, contemporaneous with the novel's publishing, of criminality and terroristic inclination endemic within Algerian communities.

References

Notes
Begag, Azouz, Alec G. Hargreaves, and Naïma Wolf. 2007. Shantytown kid = (Le gone du Chaâba). Lincoln: University of Nebraska Press.

House, Jim. "The Colonial and Post-colonial Dimensions of Algerian Migration to France." History in Focus: Migration, no. 11 (2006). http://www.history.ac.uk/ihr/Focus/Migration/index.html
MacMaster, Neil. 2003. "Islamophobia in France and the "Algerian Problem"." In The New Crusades: Constructing the Muslim Enemy. Ed. Emran Qureshi and Michael A.Sells, 288-313: Columbia University Press.

1986 novels
French bildungsromans
Algeria in fiction